After Hours at the London House is a 1959 live album by American jazz singer Sarah Vaughan, recorded at The London House, Chicago.

Track listing 
 "Like Someone in Love" (Johnny Burke, Jimmy Van Heusen) – 3:37
 "Detour Ahead" (Lou Carter, Herb Ellis, John Frigo) – 5:28
 "Three Little Words" (Bert Kalmar, Harry Ruby) – 3:40
 "I'll String Along with You" (Al Dubin, Harry Warren) – 5:15
 "You'd Be So Nice to Come Home To" (Cole Porter) – 4:00
 "Speak Low" (Ogden Nash, Kurt Weill) – 4:51
 "All of You" (Porter) – 4:15
 "Thanks for the Memory" (Ralph Rainger, Leo Robin) – 6:58

Personnel 
 Sarah Vaughan – vocals
 Ronell Bright – piano
 Richard Davis – double bass
 Roy Haynes – drums
 Thad Jones – trumpet
 Wendell Culley - trumpet
 Henry Coker – trombone
 Frank Wess – tenor saxophone
 Carmen Cavallaro – introduction voice
Technical
Malcolm Chisholm - recording engineer
Emmett McBain - design
Hollis King - art direction
Don Bronstein - cover photography

References 

Sarah Vaughan live albums
1959 live albums
Albums recorded at The London House, Chicago
Mercury Records live albums